Anna Loos (born 18 November 1970) is a German actress and singer. She has appeared in more than fifty films since 1996. Since 2006 she has been the voice of rock band Silly.

She is married to the actor Jan Josef Liefers. They have two daughters together and live in Berlin-Steglitz.

Selected filmography

References

External links
 

1970 births
Living people
People from Brandenburg an der Havel
German film actresses
German television actresses
20th-century German actresses
21st-century German actresses
German rock singers
Participants in the Bundesvision Song Contest
21st-century German  women  singers
People from Steglitz-Zehlendorf
Recipients of the Order of Merit of Berlin